Paseuthsack Souliyavong (born 26 October 1990) is a former Laotian professional footballer who played as a midfielder.

External links 
 

1990 births
Living people
Laotian footballers
Laos international footballers
Association football midfielders